The Sierra Leone cricket team toured Nigeria in October 2021 to play six Twenty20 International (T20I) matches at the University of Lagos (Unilag) Cricket Oval in the Akoka suburb of Lagos. The series provided both sides with preparation for the T20 World Cup Africa Qualifier in November 2021. The series also saw a resumption of the long-running cricketing rivalry between the two north-west African nations.

Sierra Leone stunned the hosts by winning the first match with a single scored off the last ball of their twenty overs. Nigeria levelled the series after another close finish in the second game, winning by just six runs. The third game was a more one-sided affair, with the hosts claiming a 69-run victory to lead the series 2–1 at the halfway stage. The fourth game resulted in another comfortable win for the hosts, this time by nine wickets. Nigeria sealed the series after winning the fifth game, during which Peter Aho took six wickets for just five runs, a world record for the best bowling figures in a T20I.

Squads

T20I series

1st T20I

2nd T20I

3rd T20I

4th T20I

5th T20I

6th T20I

References

External links
 Series home at ESPN Cricinfo

Associate international cricket competitions in 2021–22